Jan Bruins (27 May 1940, in Deventer – 16 April 1997) was a former Grand Prix motorcycle road racer from the Netherlands. He had his best year in 1972 when he won the 50cc Yugoslavian Grand Prix, and finished the season in fourth place.

References 

1940 births
1997 deaths
Dutch motorcycle racers
50cc World Championship riders
Sportspeople from Deventer